The enzyme 5-dehydro-4-deoxyglucarate dehydratase catalyzes the chemical reaction

5-dehydro-4-deoxy-D-glucarate  2,5-dioxopentanoate + H2O + CO2

Enzyme class
This enzyme belongs to the family of lyases, specifically the hydro-lyases, which cleave carbon-oxygen bonds.  The systematic name of this enzyme class is 5-dehydro-4-deoxy-D-glucarate hydro-lyase (decarboxylating 2,5-dioxopentanoate-forming). Other names in common use include 5-keto-4-deoxy-glucarate dehydratase, deoxyketoglucarate dehydratase, D-4-deoxy-5-ketoglucarate hydro-lyase, and 5-dehydro-4-deoxy-D-glucarate hydro-lyase (decarboxylating).  This enzyme participates in ascorbate and aldarate metabolism.

References

 

EC 4.2.1
Enzymes of unknown structure